Axel Holmström (born June 29, 1996) is a Swedish professional ice hockey forward, currently playing for Vaasan Sport of the Finnish Liiga. Holmström was drafted 196th overall by the Detroit Red Wings in the 2014 NHL Entry Draft.

Playing career

Junior
During the 2013–14 season, Holmström recorded 15 goals and 23 assists in 33 games with Skellefteå AIK's J20 SuperElit team, as well as skating in four games for Skellefteå AIK. Holmström was ranked 90th by the NHL Central Scouting Bureau on their final list of the top draft-eligible European skaters leading into the 2014 NHL Entry Draft.

Professional
During the 2014–15 season, Holmström recorded ten goals and ten assists in 44 games during the regular season. He was tied for second overall in the SHL among junior-aged players in scoring. Holmström helped Skellefteå AIK reach the SHL Finals, and led the league in postseason scoring with seven goals and 11 assists in 15 games, breaking the league record for playoff points by a junior player, previously held by Daniel and Henrik Sedin. On June 15, 2015, the Detroit Red Wings signed Holmström to a three-year entry-level contract.

During the 2016–17 season, Holmström recorded one goal and one assist in 16 games, while being limited by injury during the regular season. He recorded three goals and four assists in seven playoff games to lead his team in playoff scoring. On April 3, 2017, Holmström was reassigned to the Grand Rapids Griffins. During the 2018–19 season, Holmström recorded 12 goals and 13 assists in 65 games for the Griffins.

On April 30, 2019, Holmström returned to Sweden and signed a two-year contract with HV71 of the Swedish Hockey League (SHL).

International play
Holmström represented Sweden at the 2013 Ivan Hlinka Memorial Tournament, where he recorded one assist in four games. He later represented Sweden at the 2014 IIHF World U18 Championships, where he was second-leading scorer during the tournament, recording three goals and eight assists in seven games. Holmström represented Sweden at the 2015 World Junior Ice Hockey Championships, where he recorded one goal and six assists in seven games. Holmström again represented Sweden at the 2016 World Junior Ice Hockey Championships, where he recorded one goal and five assists in seven games.

Career statistics

Regular season and playoffs

International

Awards and honours

References

External links

1996 births
Living people
Detroit Red Wings draft picks
Grand Rapids Griffins players
HV71 players
Skellefteå AIK players
Swedish ice hockey centres
Vaasan Sport players